Cham Chit or Cham-e Chit may refer to:

Cham Chit, Khuzestan
Cham Chit, Lorestan